Comcast Spectacor is a Philadelphia-based American sports and entertainment company. It owns the Philadelphia Flyers of the National Hockey League, the Maine Mariners of the ECHL, the Philadelphia Wings of the National Lacrosse League, the Seoul Infernal of the Overwatch League, and formerly owned the Philadelphia 76ers of the National Basketball Association. The company owns and manages the Wells Fargo Center and formerly managed the Spectrum in South Philadelphia (before that arena was demolished), plus several community skating rinks in the Philadelphia region known as Flyers Skate Zone. The Comcast SportsNet (CSN) regional sports networks were also owned by Comcast Spectacor prior to parent company Comcast's acquisition of NBCUniversal in January 2011; CSN is now operated through NBC Sports.

The company was formed in 1974 by Flyers founder and chairman Ed Snider as Spectacor, the parent company of both the Flyers and the Spectrum. Snider had been instrumental in getting the Spectrum built in 1967 and assumed control of the arena in 1971.  He sold a 63% stake in Spectacor to Comcast in 1996 but remained as chairman of the renamed Comcast Spectacor. Shortly afterward, Comcast Spectacor bought the 76ers; as the Spectrum's owner, Snider had been the Sixers' landlord since 1971. Comcast Spectacor sold the 76ers to Joshua Harris in 2011. In April 2016, Snider died at his home in California. On September 22, 2016, Comcast announced that it would buy out the remaining 24% that it did not already own.

Spectra Experiences

Comcast Spectacor is the principal owner of Spectra (formerly Global Spectrum, Ovations and Paciolan).  Globally, Spectra serves 300-plus clients at more than 400 properties including public assembly facilities throughout the United States and Canada, such as arenas, civic and convention centers, stadiums, university convocation center, trade and exposition centers, community ice rinks and theaters.  Some of the arenas and stadiums currently managed by Spectra are:
 Addition Financial Arena at the University of Central Florida in Orlando, Florida
 Angel of the Winds Arena in Everett, Washington
 Atlantic City Convention Center and Boardwalk Hall in Atlantic City, New Jersey
 Augusta Entertainment Complex in Augusta, Georgia
 Budweiser Gardens in London, Ontario, Canada
 Chaifetz Arena at Saint Louis University in St. Louis, Missouri
 Children's Mercy Park in Kansas City, Kansas
 Cleveland State University Wolstein Center, in Cleveland, Ohio
 Cross Insurance Arena in Portland, Maine
 Cross Insurance Center in Bangor, Maine
 Crown Coliseum in Fayetteville, North Carolina
 CURE Insurance Arena in Trenton, New Jersey
 Denny Sanford Premier Center in Sioux Falls, South Dakota
 Duke Energy Convention Center in Cincinnati, Ohio
 Fargodome in Fargo, North Dakota
 Federal Way Performing Arts and Event Center, Federal Way, Washington
 Ford Entertainment Complex in Beaumont, Texas
 Glens Falls Civic Center in Glens Falls, New York
 Liacouras Center at Temple University in Philadelphia, Pennsylvania
 Lowell Memorial Auditorium, located in Lowell, Massachusetts
 Overland Park Convention Center in Overland Park, Kansas
 PPL Center in Allentown, Pennsylvania
 RingCentral Coliseum in Oakland, California
 Sears Centre Arena in Hoffman Estates, Illinois, a Chicago suburb
 SeatGeek Stadium in Bridgeview, Illinois, a Chicago suburb
 Sioux Falls Convention Center in Sioux Falls, South Dakota
 South Okanagan Events Centre in Penticton, British Columbia
 St. Charles Convention Center in Saint Charles, Missouri
 State Farm Stadium in Glendale, Arizona
 Subaru Park in Chester, Pennsylvania, a Philadelphia suburb
 Tribute Communities Centre in Oshawa, Ontario, Canada
 Tyson Events Center in Sioux City, Iowa
 University of Massachusetts Amherst William D. Mullins Memorial Center, located in Amherst, Massachusetts
 University of Massachusetts Lowell Tsongas Center, located in Lowell, Massachusetts
 Value City Arena at The Ohio State University, in Columbus, Ohio
 Watsco Center at the University of Miami in Coral Gables, Florida
 Wells Fargo Arena, part of the Iowa Events Center in Des Moines, Iowa
 Wells Fargo Center is in Spectra's corporate hometown of Philadelphia.  The Wells Fargo Center's predecessor, The Spectrum, is the namesake of the company.
 WFCU Centre in Windsor, Ontario
 XL Center in Hartford, Connecticut
 Colisée Vidéotron in Trois-Rivières, Quebec, Canada

Spectra	is composed of three divisions: Venue Management (formerly Global Spectrum), Food Services & Hospitality (formerly Ovations Food Services), and Ticketing & Fan Engagement (formerly Paciolan).

On June 12, 2017, Learfield, acquired Spectra's Ticketing & Fan Engagement division - formerly known as Paciolan - from Comcast Spectacor.

In August 2021, it was announced that Spectra would be merging with Oak View Group to form a full-service live events company.

On November 19, 2021, Oak View Group completed the acquisition of Spectra to form a full-service live events company.

Other businesses
Comcast Spectacor owns Ovations Food Services, which provides food and beverage services to arenas, stadiums, amphitheaters, fairgrounds and convention centers throughout the United States.  The roots of the name Ovations go back to a restaurant in the Spectrum, which was located below the concourse.

New Era Tickets is the full-service ticketing subsidiary of Comcast Spectacor, and provides in-house ticketing in the US and Canada.  In Philadelphia, the company operates under the name ComcastTIX and provides tickets to events at Wells Fargo Center, Liacouras Center at Temple University, Sun National Bank Center in Trenton, New Jersey, and the Borgata Hotel Casino and Spa in Atlantic City, New Jersey.

Comcast Spectacor owns the Seoul Infernal, an Overwatch League team. The organization partnered with SK Telecom to establish a joint venture with T1 Entertainment & Sports to develop esports teams around the world.

Comcast Spectacor also oversees G4, a former video game-centric cable and satellite network that was operated by G4 Media from April 24, 2002 to December 31, 2014. The network was relaunched in November 2021 and shuttered in November of the following year.

References

External links
Comcast-Spectacor
Spectra

Comcast subsidiaries
Philadelphia Flyers
Philadelphia 76ers
Entertainment companies of the United States
Property management companies
Sports management companies
Entertainment companies established in 1974
American companies established in 1974
1974 establishments in Pennsylvania
1996 mergers and acquisitions
Companies based in Philadelphia
Philadelphia Fusion